William Hart, also Will, Willy, Bill, or Billy Hart may refer to:

Arts and entertainment
 William Hart (actor) (died 1650), English Caroline actor
 William Hart (painter) (1823–1894), Scottish-American painter
 William Hart (singer) (1945–2022), American soul singer, member of The Delfonics
 William Matthew Hart (1830–1908), British lithographer and bird artist
 William S. Hart (1864–1946), American silent film actor, screenwriter, director, and producer
 William Sterling Hart (1917–2006), American actor, better known as Robert Sterling
 Will Cullen Hart (born 1971), American musician and artist
 Billy Hart (born 1940), American jazz drummer

Judiciary
 William Hart of Livelands, Scottist jurist and 16th century Lord Advocate
 William H. H. Hart (1848–1903), American California attorney general
 William L. Hart (1867–1962), American justice of the Supreme Court of Ohio
 William Thomas Hart (1929-2023), United States federal judge

Sports
 Bill Hart (pitcher) (1865–1936), American professional baseball pitcher
 Billy Hart (baseball) (1866–1944), American professional baseball player
 Bill Hart (infielder) (1913–1968), American professional baseball third-baseman with the Brooklyn Dodgers
 Bill Hart (footballer) (1923–1990), English professional footballer

Other fields
 William Hart (MP), Member of Parliament (MP) for Bletchingley
 William Hart (politician) (1825–1904), Tasmanian businessman served in three tiers of Government
 William E. Hart (1843–1874), Union Army soldier during the American Civil War
 William Hart (priest) (1558–1583), Catholic martyr
 William Hart (Medal of Honor) (1866–1899), American sailor
 William Hart (bishop) (1904–1992), Bishop of Dunkeld
 William Hart (police chief) (1924–2003), Detroit Police Chief
 William Hart, drilled the first natural gas well in the United States, leading to the formation of the Fredonia Gas Light Company
 William Neville Hart (1741–1804), British banker, politician and diplomat
 William Ewart Hart (1885–1943), Australian aviator and dentist
 William Stanford Hart Sr. (1925–1999), mayor of East Orange, New Jersey
 William C. Hart (1898–1963), United States Coast Guard member awarded the Gold Lifesaving Medal

Fictional characters
 Bill Hart (comics), the civilian identity of the Lev Gleason Publications and Image Comics superhero Daredevil